Nueil-les-Aubiers is a commune in the Deux-Sèvres department in western France.

Population

Twin towns
In 1996 it was twinned with the town of Attleborough in Norfolk, England.

See also
Communes of the Deux-Sèvres department

References

Communes of Deux-Sèvres